{{Speciesbox
|genus = Myrciaria
|species = delicatula
|authority = (DC.) O.Berg
|status_system = IUCN3.1
|status = LC
|status_ref = 
|synonyms =
    {{Plainlist | style = margin-left: 1em; text-indent: -1em; |
Eugenia delicatula DC.
Eugenia delicatula var. conferta Kiaersk.
Eugenia maschalantha Kiaersk. [Illegitimate]
Luma maschalantha Herter
Myrciaria delicatula var. acutifolia O.Berg
Myrciaria delicatula var. angustifolia O.Berg
Myrciaria delicatula var. conferta O.Berg
Myrciaria delicatula var. delicatulaMyrciaria delicatula var. latifolia O.BergMyrciaria linearifolia O.BergMyrciaria macrocarpa UsteriMyrciaria maschalantha (Herter) Mattos & D.LegrandMyrciaria micrantha Barb.Rodr. ex Chodat & Hassl. [Invalid]Paramyrciaria delicatula (DC.) KauselParamyrciaria delicatula var. argentinensis KauselParamyrciaria delicatula var. linearifolia (O.Berg) O.Berg
    }}
|synonyms_ref = 

Distribution 
Myrciaria delicatula is found in araucaria moist forests, gallery forests and grasslands in Argentina, Paraguay, Bolivia, and southern and eastern Brazil.

Description 
Myrciaria delicatula grows slowly to a semideciduous shrub or small tree, between 4 and 10 metres tall. The leaves are simple, hairless, opposite, with a stem of between 2 and 4mm long, and a texture similar to cardboard. The leaf is between 2 and 3.5cm long and between 0.5 and 1.1cm wide, has a wedge-shaped base, and ends with a short tip. The plant produces edible black berries around 10mm in diameter, containing between 1 and 4 seeds. The flavour of the fruit has been compared to that of Eugenia pyriformis.

References

delicatula
Crops originating from the Americas
Tropical fruit
Flora of South America
Fruits originating in South America
Cauliflory
Fruit trees
Berries